Guni (Güna)  is a rural locality (a selo) in Vedensky District, Chechnya.

Administrative and municipal status 
Municipally, Guni is incorporated into Guninskoye rural settlement. It is the administrative center of the municipality and one of the four settlements included in it.

Geography 

Guni is located between two of the left tributaries of the Gums River.

The nearest settlements to Guni are Serzhen-Yurt in the north-west, Marzoy-Mokhk in the north, Achereshki and Enikali in the north-east, Gezinchu in the east, Agishbatoy and Mesedoy in the south-east, and Khadzhi-Yurt in the south-west.

History 
In 1944, after the genocide and deportation of the Chechen and Ingush people and the Chechen-Ingush ASSR was abolished, the village of Guni was renamed to Tashi, and settled by people from the neighboring republic of Dagestan. From 1944 to 1957, it was a part of the Vedensky District of the Dagestan ASSR.

In 1958, after the Vaynakh people returned and the Chechen-Ingush ASSR was restored, the village regained its old Chechen name, Guna.

Population 
 1990 Census: 1000
 2002 Census: 647
 2010 Census: 849
 2019 estimate: ?

According to the 2010 Census, the majority of residents of Guni were ethnic Chechens.

References 

Rural localities in Vedensky District